Ambassis nalua, the scalloped glassfish or scalloped perchlet, is a species of fish in the genus Ambassis. It is native to the Indo-Pacific region, form India to Australia and New Guinea, where it occurs in bays, estuaries and mangrove-lined creeks.

References

scalloped glassfish
Marine fish of Northern Australia
scalloped glassfish
Taxa named by Francis Buchanan-Hamilton